The 2018–19 Lafayette Leopards women's basketball team represents Lafayette College during the 2018–19 NCAA Division I women's basketball season. The Leopards, led by second year head coach Kia Damon, play their home games at Kirby Sports Center and were members of the Patriot League. They finished the season 9–22, 2–16 in Patriot League play to finish in last place. They advanced to the quarterfinals of the Patriot League women's tournament where they lost to Bucknell.

Roster

Schedule

|-
!colspan=9 style=| Non-conference regular season

|-
!colspan=9 style=| Patriot League regular season

|-
!colspan=9 style=| Patriot League Women's Tournament

See also
 2018–19 Lafayette Leopards men's basketball team

References

Lafayette
Lafayette Leopards women's basketball seasons
Lafayette
Lafayette